The Walker Homestead Historic District encompasses a collection of related agricultural and homesteading properties in rural White County, Arkansas. The oldest portion of the oldest house is a single pen log structure built about 1850 by William Walker, one of the area's early settlers, while the other house is a c. 1900 vernacular Greek Revival structure built by Billy Walker, Sr.  The district encapsulates a typical evolutionary history of rural properties in the region, and was listed on the National Register of Historic Places in 1992.

See also
National Register of Historic Places listings in White County, Arkansas

References

Historic districts on the National Register of Historic Places in Arkansas
National Register of Historic Places in White County, Arkansas
I-houses in Arkansas
Dogtrot architecture in Arkansas